Comair was a wholly owned subsidiary airline of Delta Air Lines, headquartered on the grounds of Cincinnati/Northern Kentucky International Airport in Boone County, Kentucky, United States, west of Erlanger, and south of Cincinnati. Comair operated passenger services to 83 destinations in the USA, Canada, Mexico and the Bahamas at its peak in 2005.

Route history
Comair operated as a Delta Connection carrier under Delta Air Lines, with its main hub located at Cincinnati/Northern Kentucky International Airport (CVG). In its earliest years, Comair built up a hub-and-spoke network from Cincinnati (CVG) and Orlando (MCO). Comair went public starting in 1981, promoting a large expansion in destinations and routes. In 1984, Comair began service under Delta Air Lines and introduced its first international flights from Cincinnati to Toronto.

Comair ceased operations on September 29, 2012, at which point its Cincinnati hub, aircraft, and routes were transferred to Pinnacle Airlines.

Destinations
Note: All Comair service ended on September 29, 2012.

See also
 Comair
 Cincinnati/Northern Kentucky International Airport

References 

Comair